El Porvenir is a city in Northern Peru, capital of the district El Porvenir in Trujillo Province of the region La Libertad. This city is located some 4 km east of the Historic Centre of Trujillo city.

Festivals
International Calzaferia El Porvenir it is a fair of footwear and in 2012 took place the 10th edition; it is held in El Porvenir city.

Nearby cities
Trujillo, Peru
Víctor Larco Herrera

See also
La Libertad Region
Simbal
Moche River

References

External links
Location of El Porvenir by Wikimapia

Populated places in La Libertad Region
Cities in La Libertad Region
Localities of Trujillo, Peru